Douglas Elton Fairbanks Jr.,  (December 9, 1909 – May 7, 2000) was an American actor, producer, and decorated naval officer of World War II. He is best-known for starring in such films as The Prisoner of Zenda (1937), Gunga Din (1939), and The Corsican Brothers (1941). The son of  Douglas Fairbanks and stepson of Mary Pickford, he was first married, briefly, to actress Joan Crawford.

Early life 

Douglas Elton Fairbanks Jr. was born in New York City; he was the only child of actor Douglas Fairbanks and his first wife, Anna Beth Sully, the daughter of wealthy industrialist Daniel J. Sully. Fairbanks' father was one of cinema's first icons, noted for such swashbuckling adventure films as The Mark of Zorro, Robin Hood, and The Thief of Bagdad. Fairbanks had small roles in his father's films American Aristocracy (1916) and The Three Musketeers (1921).

His parents divorced when he was nine years old, and both remarried. He lived with his mother in New York, California, Paris, and London.

Fairbanks began his education at the exclusive Hollywood School for Boys in Los Angeles. After his mother and stepfather moved to New York, he attended the Bovee School, a private grammar school for boys. While attending Bovee, he was also enrolled in an after-school drill academy called Knickerbocker Greys, which he attended for a year while assigned to the drum corps. After moving back to California, he attended Harvard Military School, followed by studies at the Polytechnic School in Pasadena. After his mother and he moved to France, Fairbanks attended Lycée Janson-de-Sailly.

Film career

Stephen Steps Out and Paramount 
Largely on the basis of his father's name, in May 1923, Fairbanks Jr. was given a contract with Paramount Pictures at age 13, at $1,000 a week for three years. He was signed by Jesse L. Lasky, who said the junior Fairbanks "is the typical American boy at his best" and said he likely would be featured in a film about Tom Sawyer.

"I do not think it is the right thing for the boy to do", said his father. "I want to see him continue his education. He is only 13 years old." The young actor arrived in Hollywood in June 1923 and was mobbed.

Tom Sawyer was not made. Instead, Fairbanks Jr. appeared in Stephen Steps Out (1923). The film was not a hit.

Paramount and he parted ways by mutual consent and Doug went to Paris to resume his studies. A year later, he returned to the studio, hired at what Fairbanks called "starvation wages", and having him work as a camera assistant.

"I was anxious to build my career as an actor slowly and painstakingly", he said. "I don't want to be a young, blond leading man with an aquiline nose and shiny white teeth."

Paramount gave him supporting roles in The Air Mail (1925) and Wild Horse Mesa (1925).

Stella Dallas and Young Woodley 
Sam Goldwyn borrowed him to play the juvenile in Stella Dallas (1925), which wound up being his first box-office success. He had supporting roles in Paramount's The American Venus (1926), and Padlocked (1926).  At Warner Bros., Fairbanks was in Broken Hearts of Hollywood (1926), then, at Metropolitan Pictures, he was in Man Bait (1927).

At MGM, he was in Edmund Goulding's Women Love Diamonds (1927) and for Alfred E. Green at Fox he was in Is Zat So? (1927). He supported Will Rogers in A Texas Steer (1927). Also in 1927, Fairbanks made his stage debut in Young Woodley based on a book by John Van Druten. Fairbanks Jr received excellent reviews and the production was a success – the play did much to improve his reputation in Hollywood. A regular audience member was Joan Crawford, with whom Fairbanks became romantically involved. He also appeared in a stage production of Saturday's Children.

Early leading-man roles 
Fairbanks' second lead role was in Dead Man's Curve (1928) for FBO. He was Helene Chadwick's leading man in Modern Mothers (1928) at Columbia, and he starred in The Toilers (1928) for Tiffany. Fairbanks starred in another for Columbia, The Power of the Press (1928), directed by Frank Capra. He went back to supporting roles for The Barker (1928) at First National, his first "talkie" and A Woman of Affairs (1928) at MGM with Greta Garbo and John Gilbert.

Fairbanks had another starring role at FBO with The Jazz Age (1929) and received top billing over Loretta Young in Fast Life (1929) at Warner Bros. He appeared in MGM's Our Modern Maidens (1929) opposite Crawford.

First National and Warner Bros. 
First National gave Fairbanks a starring role in The Careless Age (1929), and he was reunited with Young in The Forward Pass (1929). He was one of many names in The Show of Shows (1929). In September 1929, he returned to the stage in a production of The Youngest. Victor Halperin cast Fairbanks in the lead of Party Girl (1929). then back at First National. he did a third with Young, Loose Ankles (1930).

In 1930, Fairbanks Jr. went to Warner Bros. to test for the second lead in Moby Dick (1930). Although he did not win the part, head of production Darryl F. Zanuck was impressed with Douglas's screen test, and cast him in an important role in The Dawn Patrol directed by Howard Hawks. Universal borrowed him to have the lead role in Little Accident (1930) and at Warner Bros., he was in the lead in The Sin Flood (1930). He supported Leslie Howard in the prestigious Outward Bound (1930) and was Billie Dove's leading man in One Night at Susie's (1930).

Little Caesar 
Fairbanks had a role supporting Edward G. Robinson in Little Caesar (1931), filmed in August 1930. "We knew it was going to be good when we were making it, but not that it would become a classic", he later said. The movie was a big hit, and Warner Bros. offered Fairbanks Jr. a contract with cast and script approval – a condition which, Fairbanks Jr. says, was only offered to one other actor at the studio, Richard Barthelmess.

"By sheer accident, I had four successes in a row in the early '30s, and although I was still in my 20s, I demanded and received approval of cast, story, and director. I don't know how I got away with it, but I did!" Because he spoke French, he was put in L'aviateur (1931). Back in Hollywood, he was in Chances (1931) and I Like Your Nerve (1931) with Young.

In June 1931, he starred in another play, The Man in Possession, which he also produced along with Sid Grauman. Fairbanks said he wanted to stay away from costume adventures, which were associated with his father.  He starred in two for Alfred E Green, Gentleman for a Day (1932) with Joan Blondell and It's Tough to Be Famous (1932). He starred in a film shot in French, L'athlète incomplet (1932).

He starred in Love Is a Racket (1932) for William Wellman and Scarlet Dawn (1932) for William Dieterle. Fairbanks did another with Green, Parachute Jumper (1933), which gave an early co-starring role to Bette Davis. Fairbanks starred again with Young in The Life of Jimmy Dolan (1933) and did The Narrow Corner (1933) with Green. RKO borrowed Fairbanks to support Katharine Hepburn in Morning Glory (1933), a big success.

Fairbanks was reunited with Howard in Captured! (1933). In 1934, Warner asked all its stars to take a 50% pay cut because of the Depression. Fairbanks Jr. refused and was fired from the studio. He received a job offer from Britain and spent the next few years there, taking a residence in London's Park Lane.

Britain and Criterion films 
Fairbanks went to Britain to star in Alex Korda's The Rise of Catherine the Great (1934) playing Grand Duke Peter opposite Elisabeth Bergner. "Hollywood was getting to be a grind", he said at the time. "They had me doing five and six pictures a year. Some of them looked all right on paper, but they had the habit of slipping down into programmer class. Only once in three years would I get a part that I cared about. I kept going up and down the ladder and not getting any place. There was nothing stable about my career in Hollywood."

He intended to return to Hollywood to appear in Design for Living, but became ill and was replaced by Gary Cooper. He did ultimately return to Hollywood for Success at Any Price (1934) at RKO, then returned to London for Mimi (1935). The latter starred Gertrude Lawrence, who became romantically involved with Fairbanks Jr. He announced he would make Zorro Rides Again with his father.

Fairbanks fell ill during the 1936 flu epidemic.

Fairbanks set up his own film production company, Criterion Films, where the board members included Paul Czinner. Among Criterion's films were Man of the Moment (1935), The Amateur Gentleman (1936), Accused (1936), and Jump for Glory (1937). He announced Lancelot, but did not make it.

Return to Hollywood and focus on action roles 
Fairbanks Jr. returned to Hollywood when David O. Selznick offered him the role of Rupert of Hentzau in  The Prisoner of Zenda (1937). He had been reluctant to accept the role, but his father urged him to do it, saying it was "actor proof". The movie was a big success.

In December 1937, he signed a nonexclusive contract with RKO to make two films a year for five years, at $75,000 a film. RKO used him as Irene Dunne's leading man in Joy of Living (1938). At Universal, he was Danielle Darrieux's co-star in The Rage of Paris (1938) and Ginger Rogers's in RKO's Having Wonderful Time (1938). Selznick used him again in The Young in Heart (1938) with Janet Gaynor.

Fairbanks then had his biggest-ever hit with RKO's Gunga Din (1939), alongside Cary Grant and Victor McLaglen. He began to work increasingly in action/adventure films: The Sun Never Sets (1939) at Universal; Rulers of the Sea (1939) at Paramount; Green Hell (1940) for James Whale at Universal, a flop; and Safari (1940) at Paramount. 

He had a change of pace when he starred in and co-produced Angels Over Broadway (1940), written and directed by Ben Hecht at Columbia. His last film before enlisting was The Corsican Brothers (1941), a swashbuckler made as a tribute to Fairbanks' father. Fairbanks did not have faith in the film while it was being filmed ("I thought we were cutting corners"), but it was a huge success.

World War II 

Fairbanks was commissioned as a reserve officer in the United States Navy when the United States entered World War II, and was assigned to Lord Mountbatten's commando staff in the United Kingdom.

In 1941, President Franklin D. Roosevelt appointed him special envoy to South America. Fairbanks served on the cruiser  during the disastrous Convoy PQ 17 operation.

Lieutenant Fairbanks was subsequently transferred to Virginia Beach, where he came under the command of Admiral H. Kent Hewitt, who was preparing U.S. naval forces for the invasion of North Africa. Fairbanks convinced Hewitt of the advantages of a military deception unit, then repeated the proposal at Hewitt's behest to Admiral Ernest King, Chief of Naval Operations. King thereupon issued a secret letter on March 5, 1943, charging the Vice Chief of Naval Operations with the recruitment of 180 officers and 300 enlisted men for the Beach Jumpers program.

The Beach Jumpers' mission would simulate amphibious landings with a very limited force. Operating miles from the actual landing beaches and using their deception equipment, the Beach Jumpers would lure the enemy into believing that theirs was the principal landing.

United States Navy Beach Jumpers saw their initial action in Operation Husky, the invasion of Sicily. For the remainder of the war, the Beach Jumpers conducted their hazardous, shallow-water operations throughout the Mediterranean.

For his planning the diversion-deception operations and his part in the amphibious assault on Southern France, Lieutenant Commander Fairbanks was awarded the United States Navy's Legion of Merit with bronze V (for valor), the Italian War Cross for Military Valor, the French Légion d'honneur and the Croix de Guerre with Palm, and the British Distinguished Service Cross.

Fairbanks was also awarded the Silver Star for valor displayed while serving on PT boats, and in 1942, made an Officer of the National Order of the Southern Cross, conferred by the Brazilian government.

Among his other exploits was the sinking of the corvette UJ-6083 (formerly the Regia Marina  Capriolo) while in command of a mixed division of American PT boats and British s plus assorted other small craft. Fairbanks stayed in the US Naval Reserve after the war, and ultimately retired as a captain in 1954. In 1982, Fairbanks was awarded the German Federal Cross of Merit for his contribution to the relief of the needy in occupied Germany.

Postwar years

Hollywood 

Fairbanks returned to Hollywood at the conclusion of World War II. He spent two years finding a comeback vehicle, and picked Sinbad the Sailor (1947), which was not a big hit.

He followed it with The Exile (1947), another swashbuckler, which Fairbanks wrote and produced; it was directed by Max Ophüls. The film was the first of three independent films Fairbanks was to produce – the others being a big screen version of Terry and the Pirates, and a film called Happy Go Lucky. It was another box office disappointment.

He thought his career would be revived by That Lady in Ermine with Betty Grable, but director Ernst Lubitsch died during production and was replaced by Otto Preminger; the resulting film was not a success, and Fairbanks Jr believes this cost his career momentum.  Fairbanks tried another swashbuckler for his own company, The Fighting O'Flynn (1949).

British career 
As a confirmed Anglophile, Fairbanks spent much time in the United Kingdom, where he was well known in the highest social circles. He was made an Honorary Knight Commander of the Order of the British Empire (KBE) in 1949 and moved there in the early 1950s.

The College of Arms in London granted Fairbanks a coat of arms symbolizing the U.S. and Britain united across the blue Atlantic Ocean by a silken knot of friendship.

Fairbanks starred in the British thriller State Secret (1950), written and directed by Sidney Gilliat, and a comedy for Val Guest, Mr Drake's Duck (1951)

Between 1954 and 1956, he also made a number of half-hour programs at one of the smaller Elstree film studios as part of a syndicated anthology series for television called Douglas Fairbanks Presents.

During the 1950s, Fairbanks appeared as himself on episodes of a number of American television shows, such as Your Show of Shows, The Ford Show, The Steve Allen Plymouth Show, and What's My Line?.

He co-produced the films The Silken Affair (1957) and Chase a Crooked Shadow (1958).

In 1961, he was a guest at the wedding of Katharine Worsley to Prince Edward, Duke of Kent.

He guest-starred on shows such as Route 66, The DuPont Show of the Week, The United States Steel Hour, The Red Skelton Hour, Dr. Kildare, and ABC Stage 67. He played King Richard in a TV musical The Legend of Robin Hood (1968).

Later career 
On stage, Fairbanks toured in My Fair Lady in 1968, and in The Pleasure of His Company several times, including tours in the U.S. in 1970–72 and the 1977 Australian production with Stanley Holloway, David Langton, Carole Ray- and Christine Amore. He appeared in some TV movies and TV series, including The Crooked Hearts (1972), The Hostage Tower (1980), and The Love Boat.

His last feature film was Ghost Story (1981). His last TV roles were in the mini series Strong Medicine (1987) and the TV series B.L. Stryker. He was the subject of This Is Your Life in 1989, when he was surprised by Michael Aspel in the foyer of Thames Television's Teddington Studios.

Fairbanks was also involved in several successful business ventures. These included manufacturing ball point pens, real estate development, management of copyrighted theatrical works, and film production.

Personal life 
His first notable relationship was with the actress Joan Crawford, whom he began to date seriously during the filming of Our Modern Maidens. Fairbanks and Crawford married on June 3, 1929, at St. Malachy in New York City. Fairbanks was only 19; Crawford was 4 years older. Their witnesses were his mother, Beth Sully, and actor Jack Whiting, who got married themselves a few weeks later. 

Fairbanks and Crawford travelled to Britain on a delayed honeymoon, where he was entertained by Noël Coward, Gertrude Lawrence, Beatrice Lillie, and Prince George, Duke of Kent. He became active in both society and politics, but Crawford was far more interested in her career and had an affair with Clark Gable. In his first autobiography, he later admitted that he was also unfaithful during that period and that he unsuccessfully pursued Katharine Hepburn during the filming of Morning Glory. The couple divorced in 1933, but the divorce did not become final for another year.

Despite their divorce, Fairbanks was quick to defend Crawford when her adopted daughter Christina Crawford published Mommie Dearest, a scathing biography of Crawford's personal life. He firmly stated, "The Joan Crawford that I've heard about in Mommie Dearest is not the Joan Crawford I knew back then." In his autobiography, he stated that he never saw a hint of any significant anger outbursts from Crawford during their marriage, and that she was more likely to sulk or argue than become angry.

On April 22, 1939, Fairbanks married Mary Lee Hartford (née Mary Lee Epling), a former wife of Huntington Hartford, the A&P supermarket heir. He remained devoted to her until her death in 1988. They had three daughters: Daphne, Victoria, and Melissa, and eight grandchildren and 10 great-grandchildren. On May 30, 1991, Fairbanks married Vera Lee Shelton, a merchandiser for QVC Network Inc.

Douglas Fairbanks Jr. was claimed to be the naked man in the incriminating photos used as evidence in the divorce trial of Margaret Campbell, Duchess of Argyll in 1963. However, in 2013, Lady Colin Campbell, Margaret Campbell's stepdaughter-in-law, revealed that the man in the photo was actually Bill Lyons, sales director of Pan American Airlines.

Fairbanks was also named in connection with the Profumo Scandal.

Fairbanks was a friend of Laurence Olivier and was among the contributors to a documentary by The South Bank Show titled Laurence Olivier: A Life. He was also a close friend of Sir Rex Harrison and was a presenter at Harrison's New York City memorial service.

He wrote his autobiography The Salad Days in 1988.  In addition, Fairbanks wrote a chronicle of his experiences during the Second World War, A Hell of a War, published in 1993. Beyond his two volumes of autobiography, Fairbanks collaborated with Richard Schickel on the illustrated survey of Fairbanks Sr. and Jr. called The Fairbanks Album (1975) and Jeffrey Vance with a critical study/biography of Fairbanks Sr. ultimately published as Douglas Fairbanks (2008).

Death and legacy 

On the morning of May 7, 2000, Fairbanks died at the age of 90 of a heart attack and was interred at the Hollywood Forever Cemetery in Hollywood, California, in the same tomb as his father.

Fairbanks has three stars on the Hollywood Walk of Fame - one for motion pictures at 6318 Hollywood Boulevard, one for television at 6665 Hollywood Boulevard, and one for radio at 6710 Hollywood Boulevard. In 1969, he was inducted into the Hall of Fame of the International Best Dressed List.

The moving image collection of Douglas Fairbanks Jr., held at the Academy Film Archive, includes over 90 reels of home movies.

Estate 
Fairbanks's personal belongings were auctioned September 13, 2011, by Doyle New York, surpassing estimated proceeds by netting over $500,000.

Filmography

Radio appearances

Awards and honors 

 Silver Star
 Legion of Merit
 American Defense Service Medal with "A" device
 American Campaign Medal
 European-African-Middle Eastern Campaign Medal
 World War II Victory Medal
 Naval Reserve Medal
 Knight Commander of the Order of the British Empire, 1949 (KBE, United Kingdom)
 Knight of the Order of St John (KStJ, United Kingdom)
 Knight of the Legion of Honor (France)
 Officer of the Order of the Southern Cross (Brazil)
 Distinguished Service Cross (United Kingdom)
 Croix de Guerre, 1939–1945 with bronze palm (France)
 War Cross for Military Valor (Italy)
 Federal Cross of Merit, Commander's Cross (West Germany)

References

Sources

Further reading

External links 

 
 
 
 
 Douglas Fairbanks Jr. and the Beach Jumpers 9:55 video

1909 births
2000 deaths
20th-century American male actors
Actors awarded knighthoods
American male child actors
American male film actors
American male radio actors
United States Navy personnel of World War II
American male silent film actors
American people of German-Jewish descent
Burials at Hollywood Forever Cemetery
American heraldists
Honorary Knights Commander of the Order of the British Empire
Recipients of the Legion of Honour
Recipients of the War Cross for Military Valor
Commanders Crosses of the Order of Merit of the Federal Republic of Germany
Knights of the Order of Saint John (chartered 1888)
Male actors from New York City
Recipients of the Distinguished Service Cross (United Kingdom)
Recipients of the Croix de Guerre 1939–1945 (France)
Recipients of the Legion of Merit
Recipients of the Silver Star
Collegiate School (New York) alumni
United States Navy captains
American expatriates in England
Paramount Pictures contract players
Warner Bros. contract players